Philemon Galindo was born in London in 1770 to James and Mary. He acted in the Bristol and Bath Theatre Royal between 1778 and 1799 and married Frances DeLaRoche in 1789, they had two children. He moved to Dublin in 1799 and married Catherine Gough, an Irish actress. They had three children, the first John, born 1802, adopted the name Juan Galindo. Philemon later moved to London where he married Ann Jeacocke and had two more children.

In 1835 he was persuaded by Juan, now an agent of United Provinces of Central America, to be commandant of Bocas Town, Bocas Del Toro, At the time this area was under the control of the New Kingdom of Granada and in 1836 they removed him from office by force. He died in London in 1840.

References

1770 births
1840 deaths
Male actors from London
English male stage actors
18th-century English male actors